Daniel W. Muhlbauer (August 6, 1958 – October 1, 2020) was an American politician who served in the Iowa House of Representatives from the 12th district from 2011 to 2015. Muhlbauer was born in Audubon, Iowa and was raised and resides in Manilla, Iowa. He has an A.A. in Agricultural Business from Iowa Falls Community College.

, Muhlbauer served on several committees in the Iowa House - the Agriculture, Public Safety, Veterans Affairs, and Ways and Means committees.  He also served as the ranking member of the Administration and Rules committee.  Muhlbauer was first elected in 2011, replacing Larry Lesle as the Democratic nominee after Lesle dropped out.

In a December 19, 2012, interview with the Daily Times Herald (Caroll, Iowa) newspaper, Representative Muhlbauer called for the ban and confiscation of all semi-automatic rifles and other firearms in the state.

"We cannot have big guns out here as far as the big guns that are out here, the semi-automatics and all of them. We can't have those running around out here. Those are not hunting weapons. We should ban those in Iowa. Even if you have them, I think we need to start taking them. We can't have those out there. Because if they're out there they're just going to get circulated around to the wrong people. Those guns should not be in the public's hands. There are just too big of guns."

Dan Muhlbauer was defeated by Brian Best in the 2014 election.

He died on October 1, 2020, in Manilla, Iowa at age 62.

Electoral history
*incumbent

References

External links

Representative Dan Muhlbauer official Iowa General Assembly site
 

1958 births
2020 deaths
Democratic Party members of the Iowa House of Representatives
People from Audubon, Iowa
People from Crawford County, Iowa